The Superior Court of California, County of Sutter, also known as the Sutter County Superior Court, is the branch of the California superior court with jurisdiction over Sutter County.

History
Sutter County was one of the original counties established when California became a state.

The first courthouse was originally built in 1850, in Nicolaus, which served as the initial county seat. It became the American Hotel after the county seat was moved to Yuba City in 1854, and was razed in 1920.

Three courthouses were built on the same site in Yuba City: one completed in 1858 (destroyed by fire in 1871, reportedly by mice gnawing on matches), another completed in 1873 (destroyed by arson in 1899), and a third completed in 1900 as a replica of the second. The third courthouse is still standing and is known as Courthouse West or Old Courthouse.

In 1920, citizens from the town of Live Oak proposed the county seat be moved there should a portion of Butte County known as the Gridley District secede and join Sutter County.

Court facilities were expanded across the street to the County Office Building, which was completed in 1953 and is also known as Courthouse East. An annex to Courthouse West was completed in 1961.

Operations at Courthouse West and Courthouse East ceased in August 2015 and were moved to the new courthouse facility. The new Sutter County Courthouse was completed in 2016, and occupied starting on January 19 of that year, consolidating court operations from three separate facilities (Courthouse West, Courthouse East, and the Family Law Center, in a leased building). The Sutter County Superior Court relinquished its interest in the Courthouse East/Sutter County Office Building in June 2016.

Judges
Christopher Chandler served as a Superior Court judge from his appointment in 1998 until his retirement on May 31, 2016.

Susan E. Green currently serves as the court's presiding judge.

References

External links
 
 

Superior Court
Superior courts in California